The lake Hóp is situated in the north of Iceland near Blönduós at the Húnafjörður.

In reality, the lake is more of a lagoon than a lake. Its surface area depends on the tides and oscillates between 29 and 44 km2. Its greatest depth is 9 m.

See also
List of lakes of Iceland

Lagoons of Europe
Bodies of water of Iceland